Elections to Manchester Council were held on Thursday, 6 May 1982. Due to demographic changes in the city since the formation of the new City Council in 1973, and in common with some other English councils in 1982, substantial boundary changes to all wards were implemented in time for these elections. The most notable changes were as follows:

- The wards of Collegiate Church and Miles Platting were merged, with most of their combined areas forming a new Central ward.

- A new ward of Benchill was carved out of the existing wards of Baguley, Crossacres, and Woodhouse Park.

- Beswick ward became the new Beswick and Clayton ward.

- Lloyd Street ward became the new Fallowfield ward.

- Crossacres ward became the new Sharston ward.

- Alexandra ward became the new Whalley Range ward.

Due to these changes, it was necessary for the whole council to be re-elected. Each ward elected three candidates, with the first-placed candidate serving a four-year term of office, expiring in 1986, the second-placed candidate serving a two-year term of office, expiring in 1984, and the third-placed candidate serving a one-year term of office, expiring in 1983. The Labour party retained overall control of the council.

Election result

After the election, the composition of the council was as follows:

Ward results

Ardwick

Baguley

Barlow Moor

Benchill

Beswick and Clayton

Blackley

Bradford

Brooklands

Burnage

Central

Charlestown

Cheetham

Chorlton

Crumpsall

Didsbury

Fallowfield

Gorton North

Gorton South

Harpurhey

Hulme

Levenshulme

Lightbowne

Longsight

Moss Side

Moston

Newton Heath

Northenden

Old Moat

Rusholme

Sharston

Whalley Range

Withington

Woodhouse Park

References

1982 English local elections
1982
1980s in Manchester
May 1982 events in the United Kingdom